Jankovich is a surname. Notable people with the surname include:

Béla Jankovich (1865–1939), Hungarian politician
István Jankovich (1889–1974), Hungarian athlete of Slovak ethnicity
Keever Jankovich (1928–1979), American football player
Sam Jankovich (1934–2019), American football player
Tim Jankovich (born 1959), American basketball player